Iordanis Pechlivanidis (born 12 September 1986) is a footballer who plays for Anagennisi Epanomi in the Greek second division. He has played in the Greek Cup for Skoda Xanthi

Career
Pechlivanidis comes from a family with a football heritage. His career began at the age of 8 in a local team (Romeo football team, coached by his father Panagiotis Pechlivanidis). He was team’s first scorer. At the age of 10 he was called by Komotini’s football youth academy. When he was 13 years old he received the fair play medal and the best player award, while playing for Komotini’s youth academy. In the age of 14 he was called by Skoda Xanthi, a Greek team playing in the First League (Super League). By the age of 17 he was playing for Skoda Xanthi junior team as a left full back.

Meanwhile he was called to join the National Junior and U21 football team. At his 18 he signed his first professional contract with Skoda Xanthi. His first match as a professional player was against Iraklis for the Greek championship. During the same season he played also against Kerkyra. The same year (2004) he participated in two matches as a Skoda Xanthi player in the National Cup, against Levadiakos (scoring one goal) and Atromitos.

Next year (2005) he was loaned to Thraki. During the 2005-2006 season he played for Kalamata F.C., while he was fulfilling his military obligations. In the first half of 2007-2008 he played for Thraki FC (Alexandroupoli) and in the second half he played for Olympiakos Volou. In the first half of 2008-2009 he played for Aiolikos and in the second half for Echinos Sport (Xanthi). In 2009-2010 season he played for the team Anagennisi Giannitsa In 2010, he joined Anagennisi Epanomi in Football League 2 (Greece).

References

External links
Iordanis Pechlivanidis Official Site
Profile at EPAE.org

1986 births
Living people
Greek footballers
Xanthi F.C. players
Kalamata F.C. players
Olympiacos Volos F.C. players
People from Shymkent
Association football defenders
Association football forwards